Vikravandi is a state assembly constituency in Tamil Nadu, India, formed after constituency delimitations in 2007. Its State Assembly Constituency number is 75. It comprises a portion of Viluppuram taluk and is included in the Villupuram constituency for national elections to the Parliament of India. It is one of the 234 State Legislative Assembly Constituencies in Tamil Nadu.

Members of Legislative Assembly

Election results

2021

2019 By-election

2016

2011

1952

References 

Assembly constituencies of Tamil Nadu
Viluppuram district